Emir Janjoš (born 28 March 1986 in Sarajevo) is a Bosnian retired football midfielder who last played for Bosna Union.

Club career
Janjoš started his career with FK Sarajevo. In October 2007, he played for Sarajevo in the UEFA Cup against FC Basel. In 2010, he moved to Norway to sign for Harstad.

However, he had to leave Norway due to problems with his work permit and decided to end his playing career immediately. He did occasionally play for Biser afterwards and turned out for amateur side Bosna Sema.

Personal life
His father Mehmed Janjoš also was a football player.

References

External links

Norwegian career stats - Alt Om Fotball

1986 births
Living people
Footballers from Sarajevo
Association football midfielders
Bosnia and Herzegovina footballers
Bosnia and Herzegovina youth international footballers
FK Sarajevo players
FK Olimpik players
Premier League of Bosnia and Herzegovina players
Bosnia and Herzegovina expatriate footballers
Expatriate footballers in Norway
Bosnia and Herzegovina expatriate sportspeople in Norway